Raekwon is a masculine given name. Notable people with the name include:

 Raekwon (Corey Woods; born 1970), American rapper and a member of Wu-Tang Clan
 Raekwon Davis (born 1997), American football defensive tackle
 Raekwon McMillan (born 1995), American football linebacker

Masculine given names